Høvåg (historically: Høvaag) is a former municipality in the old Aust-Agder county in Norway.  The  municipality existed from 1865 until its dissolution in 1962. It was located in the southern part of the present-day municipality of Lillesand which is now in Agder county. The administrative centre of the municipality was the village of Høvåg where the Høvåg Church is located. Old coastal settlements in Høvåg include Ulvøysund, Gamle Hellesund, Skottevik, Kjøbmannsvig and Åkerøyhamn. The village of Høvåg is located midway between the towns of Lillesand and Kristiansand.

History
The municipality of Høvaag was created in 1865 when the municipality of Vestre Moland was split into two separate municipalities: Høvåg (population: 2,069) in the south and Vestre Moland (population: 2,167) in the north. During the 1960s, there were many municipal mergers across Norway due to the work of the Schei Committee. On 1 January 1962, the municipality of Høvåg (population: 1,330) was merged with the neighboring municipality of Vestre Moland (population: 2,454), the ladested of Lillesand (population: 1,041), and the Gitmark farm area of Eide (population: 22). Together, these areas formed a new, larger Lillesand municipality.

Name
The municipality (originally the parish) is named after the old Høvaag farm.

Government

The municipal council  of Høvåg was made up of 17 representatives that were elected to four year terms.  The party breakdown of the final municipal council was as follows:

Attractions

Høvåg Church

Høvåg Church (Høvåg kirke) is located in Høvåg parish in Vest-Nedenes prosti. It is constructed of brick and was built ca. 1100 - 1150. The church uses a cruciform floor plan and has 400 seats. Nave is shaped like a T with the altar in the center. In 1723, the congregation started a project to expand, maintain and refurbish the church. The west wing was joined in 1768, the north wing, which is the current main entrance was built in 1828. The tower was built in 1831.

The altarpiece is a triptych representing faith, hope, and love. It is from about 1620 and was completed by an unknown artist. The pulpit is from about 1660. Around 1900 the altarpiece was painted white, but in 1935 it was restored to the present form.  The pictures on the pulpit is of the four evangelists.

Notable residents
Karl Johan Fjermeros, local politician

See also
List of former municipalities of Norway

References

External links

Lillesand
Former municipalities of Norway
1865 establishments in Norway
1962 disestablishments in Norway